Forio (known also as Forio of Ischia) is a town and comune of c. 17,000  inhabitants in the Metropolitan City of Naples, southern Italy, situated on the island of Ischia.

Overview
Its territory includes the town of Panza, the only frazione of Forio and of the island of Ischia. Panza has always been an independent village since the 16th century when a first governmental organization was introduced on the island. In the 1975 the inhabitants of Panza tried to become an independent comune but the referendum, claimed by the inhabitants of Forio, was denied by the Campania's Regional Government.

There are numerous coastal watchtowers, built from the Middle Ages against Saracen and African pirates raids.

See also
Ischia

Twin towns
 Brusson, Italy
 Polignano a Mare, Italy

References

External links

Official website 

Cities and towns in Campania
Ischia